Katharina Haecker (born 31 July 1992) is an Australian judoka. She competed at the 2016 Summer Olympics in the women's 63 kg event, in which she was eliminated in the second round by Miku Tashiro.

Haecker competed in the women's 63 kg event at the 2020 Summer Olympics held in Tokyo, Japan. She won her first bout against Gili Sharir of Israel but then lost to Juul Franssen of Netherlands and did not advance to the quarterfinals.

References

External links

 
 
 

1992 births
Living people
Australian female judoka
Olympic judoka of Australia
Judoka at the 2016 Summer Olympics
Judoka at the 2020 Summer Olympics
Commonwealth Games medallists in judo
Judoka at the 2022 Commonwealth Games
Commonwealth Games bronze medallists for Australia
21st-century Australian women
Medallists at the 2022 Commonwealth Games